The Jensen 541 is an automobile which was produced by Jensen Motors from 1954 to 1959. It was first exhibited at the London Motor Show in October 1953, and production started in 1954. 

The 541 used fibreglass bodywork mounted on a steel chassis and was fitted with a straight-six engine, three SU carburettor version of the 4-litre Austin engine and four speed transmission with optional Laycock de Normanville overdrive.

The body consisted of three major mouldings and the entire front was rear hinged and could be raised for engine access. The doors were aluminium. Suspension was independent at the front using coil springs with a Panhard rod located rigid axle and leaf springs at the rear. A choice of wire spoked or steel disc wheels with centre lock fitting was offered. At first the car had servo assisted  drum brakes but from 1956, the newly introduced 541 Deluxe version featured Dunlop disc brakes both front and rear—the first British four seater thus equipped.

It was also a luxurious car with the well equipped interior featuring leather seats as standard. The individual seats in front separated by a high transmission tunnel and the rear seats had a small centre armrest and could also be tilted forwards to increase luggage space. Standard colours (1955) were black, ivory, imperial crimson, moonbeam grey, Boticelli blue, deep green and Tampico beige.

Performance benefitted.

In 1957 the 541 R was introduced, and in 1960 the 541 S arrived with wider bodywork and revised grill styling. Production of the Jensen 541 ended in 1959 and the 541 S early 1963 when the range was replaced by the C-V8.

Performance

The test car cost £2146 (with the optional overdrive) including taxes. In 1957 Richard Jensen had a 541 deluxe built with a Chrysler Hemi engine but no performance or fuel consumption figures are known for this vehicle.
The basic car cost £1821

Drophead Coupé De Ville by Abbott Of Farnham
Two examples of the 541 were converted into drophead coupés by Abbott of Farnham.

Gallery

See also
 Jensen 541R
 Jensen 541S

References

541
Sports cars
Cars introduced in 1954